Seshego is a township in the Polokwane Local Municipality of the Capricorn District Municipality of the Limpopo province of the Republic of South Africa.  The township lies directly northwest of the city of Polokwane.

History
Between 1972 and 1974 Seshego was the capital of the non-independent Bantustan of Lebowa, which was abolished in 1994. The township's industries produce food, beverages, tobacco, textiles, wearing apparel, leather goods, wood and wood products, fabricated metal products, machinery, and equipment. Many of Seshego's inhabitants commute to Polokwane for employment.

Zones
Seshego is divided into residential  8 zones. The Economic Freedom Fighters leader Julius Malema grew up in Zone 1 in an area called Masakaneng. The Seshego Dam is a dam on the Molautsi River/Blood River in the western side of the town.

Climate
Köppen-Geiger climate classification system classifies its climate as mild semi-arid (BSk).

Notable people
Julius Malema leader of the Economic Freedom Fighters.
Da Capo, DJ and record producer.

References

Populated places in the Polokwane Local Municipality
Townships in Limpopo